eNaira is a Central bank digital currency issued and regulated by the Central Bank of Nigeria. Denominated in naira, the eNaira serves as both a medium of exchange and a store of value and claims to offer better payment prospects in retail transactions when compared to cash.

The eNaira was launched and activated on 25 October, 2021 by President Muhammad Buhari, under the slogan: "Same Naira, More Possibilities".

The eNaira Speed Wallet application is available for download on Google Play Store  and App store since October 28, 2021. New updates on the eNaira Speed wallet is now available.

See also

 Central bank digital currency
 Digital currency
 Digital renminbi
 Digital rupee

References

External links

Central Bank of Nigeria's eNaira website

Circulating currencies
Currency symbols
Currencies of Nigeria
Currencies introduced in 2021
Central bank digital currencies